Preah Sdach ("Sacred Prince") is a district located in Prey Veng Province, in south eastern Cambodia. The most popular market of Preah Sdach District is Phsar Trea which is located in Trea Commune. The Japanese-Cambodian Friendship High School is also in this district.

References 

Districts of Prey Veng province